Ernests is a Latvian masculine given name. It is a cognate of the masculine given name Ernest and may refer to:
Ernests Birznieks-Upītis (1871-1960), Latvian writer, translator and librarian
Ernests Blanks (1894–1972), Latvian publicist, independence advocate
Ernests Brastiņš (1892–1942), atvian artist, amateur historian, folklorist and archaeologist
Ernests Foldāts (1925–2003), Latvian-born Venezuelan botanist and orchidologist
Ernests Gulbis (born 1988), Latvian professional tennis player
Ernests Gūtmanis (1901-????), Latvian boxer and Olympic competitor
Ernests Kalve (born 1987), Latvian basketball forward
Ernests Mālers (1903-1982), Latvian cyclist and Olympic competitor 
Ernests Štālbergs (1883–1958), Latvian architect  
Ernests Vīgners (1850-1933), Latvian composer and conductor

Masculine given names
Latvian masculine given names